Curia in ancient Rome referred to one of the original groupings of the citizenry.

Curia may also refer to:

Historical organisations 
 , in medieval times, a suzerain lord's court, council and court of justice, consisting of vassals
 Curia regis, in England and France
 Curia Regia, in Hungary and in the Pyrenean Peninsula
 Curia ducis, in Italy
 Magna Curia, in the kingdom of Sicily

Law and politics 
 CVRIA or Court of Justice of the European Union, the institution of the European Union that encompasses the whole judiciary
 , separate electoral colleges in the curial electoral system
 Curia of Hungary, also known as the Supreme Court of Hungary

Christian organisations 
Curia (Catholic Church), an official body that governs a particular Church in Roman Catholicism
 Roman Curia, the group of administrative institutions of the Holy See
 , curia of diocese
Prima Curia, a church and spiritual organization based on ancient teachings of Jesus Christ

Places 
 Curia (land) or Courland, one of the historical and cultural regions in western Latvia
 Curia, Graubünden or Chur, a town in Switzerland

Buildings 
 Curia Hostilia, first meeting house of the Roman Senate
 Curia Cornelia, second meeting house of the Roman Senate
 Curia Julia, third meeting house of the Roman Senate
 Curia of Pompey, meeting house of the Roman Senate
 Curia Confoederationis Helveticae, the building housing the Swiss Federal Assembly and Federal Council

Plants
Justicia pectoralis, an herb also known as curia
Ayapana triplinervis, a tropical plant also known as curia

People
Curia (wife of Quintus Lucretius) (–5 BC), ancient Roman woman who hid her husband
Curia gens, an ancient Roman family
Francesco Curia (1538–1610), Italian painter

Other uses
 CURIA (Cork University and Royal Irish Academy), a project to create a corpus of Irish texts, now called CELT
 Curia TV, an American streaming service

See also